Nuapatna is a census town in Cuttack district in the Indian state of Odisha.the whole area have rich in cultural and commercial importance.

Demographics
 India census, Nuapatna had a population of 7846. Males constitute 52% of the population and females 48%. Nuapatna has an average literacy rate of 65%, higher than the national average of 59.5%: male literacy is 75%, and female literacy is 55%. In Nuapatna, 14% of the population is under 6 years of age.

Below are some pictures of hand-loom machine which is used to prepare khandua, Jala, Bomkai sarees

Places of interest
 Whole village is Famous for handloom and textiles
 Budha Temple [Budhajayantipur]
 Kalapata Mandir
 Mahadev Mandir
 college Pahada
 Jamuna
 J.spin campus
 Mahatma gandhi park
 Patita pabana mandir
 Ram mandir
 Bhagabata Pahad (mundia)
 Panthei Nala
 Chandan Pokhari
 Puruna Pokhari
 A.S High School
 Bada pokhari
 chandi chaka
 Gyana mandir
 Subhadra saree centre
 Kapileswar Temple
 Santosh handloom
 Dullali Devi girls high 
JEMADEIPUR HIGH SCHOOL

Festivals
 Durga Puja
 Chandan Yatra
 Ganesh Puja
 Khanda Pata
 Kartika purnima
 Ratha Yatra (Cart festival)
 Rama nabami
 Dolo purnima
 Shiba Bibhaha
 Diwali
Chandan yatra(majisahi &badasahi)
rasa purnami

References

Cities and towns in Cuttack district